Simon Peter Burton is a British public servant and the current Clerk of the Parliaments, the chief clerk in the House of Lords.

Burton was appointed as Clerk of the Parliaments with the effect from 2 April 2021 for a term of five years. He served earlier as Clerk Assistant and, before that, as Reading Clerk in the House of Lords.

References

Year of birth missing (living people)
Living people
Clerks of the Parliaments